A History of the American People is a 1997 book about the history of the United States by the historian Paul Johnson. First published in Great Britain, it presents Johnson's view of American history from Colonial America to the end of the 20th century.

External links
New York Times review by Pauline Maier
Booknotes interview with Johnson on A History of the American People, April 5, 1998.

1997 non-fiction books
Books by Paul Johnson (writer)
English-language books
English non-fiction books
History books about the United States
Weidenfeld & Nicolson books